Rajula Annie Watson (nee Thomas) is a Theologian who presently teaches at the Karnataka Theological College, Mangalore, a Seminary established in 1965 and affiliated to the nation's first University, the Senate of Serampore College.  Annie has been a member of the Association of Theologically Trained Women of India since 1991 as well as Associate Presbyter at CSI-Hebich Memorial Church, Mangalore.

In 2008, the Evangelical Mission in Solidarity, Stuttgart featured Annie in their journal darum-journal under the caption Kampf gegen die Erdewarmung.

Studies
Annie studied bachelor's degree in theology at the United Theological College, Bangalore between 1987–1991 where she obtained a Bachelor of Divinity (B. D.) awarded by the Senate of Serampore College (University) under the Registrarship of D. S. Satyaranjan.  She later studied for a doctorate at the University of Regensburg at the Faculty of Philosophy obtaining a Doctorate of Philosophy (Dr. Phil.) where she was supervised by Prof. Hans Schwarz.

On publication of Watson's doctoral thesis, titled, Development and Justice: A Christian Understanding of Land Ethics it was simultaneously reviewed in the following journals,

 Missionalia (2005),
 Theologische Literaturzeitung (2004),
 Theologische Revue (2004),
 Revue théologique de Louvain (2004),

Writings
 2004, Development and Justice: A Christian Understanding of Land Ethics,
 2007, Overcoming Violence against Women,* 2007, Towards a Christian Land Ethic,
 2010, Baptism, means of grace or means of conflicts? : the significance of baptism in today's religiously pluralistic society,
2010, Women and Mission in a pluralistic context
2011, Gender justice: towards full humanity of women and men
 2014, Visibility of the invisible: Status and role of women in church mission and ministry

References

Christian clergy from Karnataka
Kannada people
20th-century Indian Anglican priests
Indian Christian theologians
Senate of Serampore College (University) alumni
University of Regensburg alumni
Christian feminist theologians
1960 births
Living people
Church of South India clergy
Women Christian clergy
Academic staff of the Senate of Serampore College (University)
21st-century Indian Anglican priests